Stone Nullah Lane is a one-way street in Wan Chai, Hong Kong Island, Hong Kong.  Named after the water channel that until 1959 ran down its middle, it stretches from Lung On Street to Queen's Road East.  The street is noted for its historical landmarks, most notably the Blue House and Wan Chai Pak Tai Temple.

History

During the First Opium War, the British occupied Hong Kong in 1841 and one year later, the territory was ceded to them under the Treaty of Nanking.  At the time, a nullah or water channel made of stone or concrete was located on the street. It carried a stream that originated from the hills of Victoria Peak situated above Kennedy Road.  After travelling down the street, it drained out into Victoria Harbour underneath Wan Chai Road, which was located on Hong Kong Island's waterfront.  However, it is now situated much farther inland due to land reclamation that has been undertaken since its opening. The structure eventually lent its name to the street it was built on, and it was common for laundry to be washed in the nullah.

At the start of the 20th century, shops that processed soybeans were established near Stone Nullah Lane.  Because of the unpleasant odour emitted during the processing, this led to protests from residents in the neighbourhood.  Eventually, the shops were forced to move to other areas. The nullah, which also emitted a foul stench, was culverted in 1959 and relocated underground, where the stream from The Peak still flows today. Although the nullah can no longer be found on the lane, the street name was left unchanged.

Description and features

From its southern end, Stone Nullah Lane begins at its junction with Lung On Street.  This is where the Wan Chai Pak Tai Temple is located. Made from grey-coloured brick and granite, it was constructed in 1863, although the statue of Pak Tai inside dates even further back to 1604. The temple is the oldest in the district, and reportedly the largest on Hong Kong Island. The next landmark on the route is the headquarters of St. James' Settlement.  Situated at 85 Stone Nullah Lane, the charitable organisation was established here in 1949 with the goal of helping impoverished children living in squats around the neighbourhood, and now extends its services to needy people across the city.  The current structure towers 12-storeys above the lane. Before the street turns onto Queen's Road East and ends, it passes the Blue House, a Grade I historic building. The building—whose Spanish balconies made from cast-iron have elicited comparisons to ones in New Orleans—was built in the 1920s and was originally utilised as a health centre for the community, a school teaching kung fu from the 1950s to 1960s, and now houses a museum.

See also
 Wan Chai Heritage Trail

References

External links

 Hong Kong Housing Society: Stone Nullah Lane / Hing Wan Street / King Sing Street project

Wan Chai
Roads on Hong Kong Island